John Cloake  Hon. DLitt. (2 December 1924 – 9 July 2014) was a historian and author of several works mostly relating to the local history of Richmond upon Thames and surrounding areas. He was also a former United Kingdom diplomatic representative in Bulgaria.

Early life, education and military service

The son of Dr Cecil Stedman Cloake and Maude Osborne Newling, John Cloake was born and brought up in Wimbledon, London, where he attended King's College School. During and immediately after World War II Cloake served in the British Army as lieutenant in the Royal Engineers in India and Japan. After the war he completed his studies, reading History at Cambridge University.

Diplomatic career

In August 1948 Cloake commenced a career in the United Kingdom's Diplomatic Service, within the Foreign Office. Following an initial period in the Information Research Department, he was appointed Third Secretary in Baghdad in 1949 supporting Henry Mack and Jack Troutbeck. A posting to Saigon followed in 1951, first as Third Secretary then as Second Secretary.  In 1956 he became Private Secretary to Permanent Under-Secretary Ivone Kirkpatrick during the time of the Suez Crisis, then to Douglas Dodds-Parker and, after that, to Ian Harvey. In 1958 he transferred to New York as Commercial Consul. He then worked in Moscow and in Tehran. His final post was in Sofia as Ambassador of the United Kingdom to Bulgaria where he was in charge of the UK's diplomatic mission between 1976 and 1980.

Local historian
Cloake and his wife moved to Richmond in 1962 and soon he began researching the area's rich local history. Cloake was a leading participant in the foundation of the Richmond Local History Society and of the Museum of Richmond of which he was its first chairman. He was elected a Fellow of the Society of Antiquaries of London in March 1988 and was awarded an Honorary DLitt. from Kingston University in 2004.

Cloake appeared as a local history expert in series 5, episode 1 of Time Team, Channel 4's TV programme on archaeology, which revealed the footings of the lost Richmond Palace. It was first broadcast on 4 January 1998.

Honours
In 1977, Cloake was made a Companion of the Order of St Michael and St George (CMG).

Works
Many articles by Cloake were published in Richmond History, the Journal of the Richmond Local History Society (including a contribution to the 2015 issue, published after his death). As well as a biography of Sir Gerald Templer, who was Britain's High Commissioner to Malaya from 1952 to 1954 and military adviser to the Prime Minister, Anthony Eden, during the Suez Crisis, he wrote several books relating to the history of Richmond and its vicinity:
 
 
 
 
 
  Recounts the history of the Richmond area – including Kew, Petersham and Ham – from 1501 and is illustrated with drawings, paintings and photographs.

Personal life
While in Saigon, in 1952, he met Margaret ("Molli") Morris (1929–2008) from Washington, D.C., who was serving there in the United States Diplomatic Service, and they were married in Cambridge four years later in 1956. She died in 2008.

Death and legacy
Cloake died on 9 July 2014.

In 2016, the Museum of Richmond displayed, in partnership with the Orleans House Gallery and the Riverside Gallery, Images of Richmond, an exhibition of prints he collected that depict the local area. Seventy-eight of these prints now form the Cloake Collection  at the Orleans House Gallery.

The Royal Asiatic Society holds archival material by Cloake and his wife on Azerbaijan and Iran.

Notes

References

External links
 Cloake, John (5 March 2014): "Being British Ambassador to Bulgaria in the 70s", Global conversations, Foreign and Commonwealth Office
 Cloake Collection, Orleans House Gallery

1924 births
2014 deaths
Military personnel from London
20th-century English historians
21st-century English historians
Alumni of Peterhouse, Cambridge
Ambassadors of the United Kingdom to Bulgaria
Companions of the Order of St Michael and St George
English male non-fiction writers
Fellows of the Society of Antiquaries of London
Historians of London
Information Research Department
Members of HM Diplomatic Service
People educated at King's College School, London
People from Wimbledon, London
Richmond, London
Royal Engineers officers
Writers from London
British Army personnel of World War II
20th-century British diplomats